The Fragonard perfumery is one of the oldest perfumeries in Grasse (Côte d'Azur, France). It is located in the centre of the city.

Overview 
Fragonard was founded in 1926 by a former Parisian notary, Eugène Fuchs, in one of the oldest factories in the city, originally built by perfumer Claude Mottet in 1841. The firm is named after the local painter Jean-Honoré Fragonard, the son of the parfumer at the court.

The first Parisian boutique was opened in 1936.

The firm also owns a museum in Paris, the Musée du Parfum, which presents rare objects that evoke the history of perfumery for more than 5000 years.

The company is run by Françoise and Agnès Costa, great granddaughters of Eugène Fuchs.

Famous perfumes
 Billet Doux (1930)
 Moment Volé (1930)
 Eau de Hongrie (???)
 Belle de Nuit (1946)
 Soleil (1995)

References

External links 
 Official website
 History of Fragonard, Les Échos , December 9, 2005

Perfume houses
Companies based in Provence-Alpes-Côte d'Azur
French brands
French companies established in 1926